The Denkova-Staviski Cup is an annual international figure skating competition named after two-time World champion ice dancers Albena Denkova / Maxim Staviski of Bulgaria. It is held in November and December in Sofia, Bulgaria. In some years the senior event is part of the ISU Challenger Series. Medals may be awarded in the disciplines of men's singles, ladies' singles, pair skating, and ice dancing.

Senior medalists
CS: ISU Challenger Series

Men

Ladies

Pairs

Ice dance

Junior medalists

Men

Ladies

Pairs

Ice dance

Advanced novice medalists

Men

Ladies

References

External links
 Denkova-Staviski Cup
 International Skating Union

 
ISU Challenger Series
International figure skating competitions hosted by Bulgaria